This page lists the official World Champions – Professional Latin of the World Dance Council (WDC). The championships are authorized and organized under the auspices of the WDC, and held annually in the last quarter of each year. The competition comprises five dances: rumba, samba, paso doble, cha-cha-cha and jive, as defined in ballroom dancing terms.

Official World Championships have been held in the Latin section of ballroom dancing since they were organised by the ICBD in 1959. The ICBD was renamed WD&DSC and has been renamed again to its present title. The WDC represents all the major professional DanceSport countries. Unofficial world championships were held, usually in Paris, by several organisers pre-World War II. Some of these events included one or two Latin dances in the same competition as ballroom dances. As these events had no official standing, they are not noticed here. There is one earlier international Latin dance championship; it started in 1953 at the Elsa Wells International Dance Championships in London (see International Latin American Dance Champions). Both series have continued annually.

World Champions

See also 
International Latin American Dance Champions
Rhythm World Champions
Smooth World Champions
U.S. National Dancesport Champions (Professional Latin)
U.S. National Dancesport Champions (Professional 10-Dance)
World 10 Dance Champions
World Ballroom Dance Champions

References 

Ballroom dance competitions
Ballroom dance
Latin dances
Latin